NGC 687 is a lenticular galaxy located 220 million light-years away in the constellation Andromeda. It was discovered by astronomer William Herschel on September 21, 1786 and is a member of Abell 262.

See also
 List of NGC objects (1–1000)

References

External links
 
 

0687
01298
6782
Andromeda (constellation)
Astronomical objects discovered in 1786
Abell 262
Lenticular galaxies